In taxonomy, a group is paraphyletic if it consists of the group's last common ancestor and most of its descendants, excluding a few monophyletic subgroups. The group is said to be paraphyletic with respect to the excluded subgroups. In contrast, a monophyletic group (a clade) includes a common ancestor and all of its descendants. The terms are commonly used in phylogenetics (a subfield of biology) and in the tree model of historical linguistics. Paraphyletic groups are identified by a combination of synapomorphies and symplesiomorphies. If many subgroups are missing from the named group, it is said to be polyparaphyletic.

The term was coined by Willi Hennig to apply to well-known taxa like Reptilia (reptiles) which, as commonly named and traditionally defined, is paraphyletic with respect to mammals and birds. Reptilia contains the last common ancestor of reptiles and all descendants of that ancestor, including all extant reptiles as well as the extinct synapsids, except for mammals and birds.  Other commonly recognized paraphyletic groups include fish, monkeys, and lizards.

Etymology 

Conversely, the term monophyly, or monophyletic, builds on the Ancient Greek prefix , meaning "alone, only, unique", and refers to the fact that a monophyletic group includes organisms consisting of all the descendants of a unique common ancestor.

By comparison, the term polyphyly, or polyphyletic, uses the Ancient Greek prefix , meaning "many, a lot of", and refers to the fact that a polyphyletic group includes organisms arising from multiple ancestral sources.

Phylogenetics

In cladistics 

Groups that include all the descendants of a common ancestor are said to be monophyletic. A paraphyletic group is a monophyletic group from which one or more subsidiary clades (monophyletic groups) are excluded to form a separate group. Philosopher of science Marc Ereshefsky has argued that paraphyletic taxa are the result of anagenesis in the excluded group or groups.  Cladists do not grant paraphyletic assemblages the status of "groups" or reify them with explanations, because they represent evolutionary non-events 

A group whose identifying features evolved convergently in two or more lineages is polyphyletic (Greek πολύς [polys], "many"). More broadly, any taxon that is not paraphyletic or monophyletic can be called polyphyletic.  Empirically, the distinction between polyphyletic groups and paraphyletic groups is rather arbitrary, since the character states of common ancestors are inferences, not observations.

These terms were developed during the debates of the 1960s and 1970s accompanying the rise of cladistics.

Paraphyletic groupings are considered problematic by many taxonomists, as it is not possible to talk precisely about their phylogenetic relationships, their characteristic traits and literal extinction. Related terms are stem group, chronospecies,  budding cladogenesis, anagenesis, or 'grade' groupings. Paraphyletic groups are often relics from outdated hypotheses of phylogenic relationships from before the rise of cladistics.

Examples 

The prokaryotes (single-celled life forms without cell nuclei) are a paraphyletic grouping, because they exclude the eukaryotes, a descendant group. Bacteria and Archaea are prokaryotes, but archaea and eukaryotes share a common ancestor that is not ancestral to the bacteria. The prokaryote/eukaryote distinction was proposed by Edouard Chatton in 1937 and was generally accepted after being adopted by Roger Stanier and C.B. van Niel in 1962. The botanical code (the ICBN, now the ICN) abandoned consideration of bacterial nomenclature in 1975; currently, prokaryotic nomenclature is regulated under the ICNB with a starting date of 1 January 1980 (in contrast to a 1753 start date under the ICBN/ICN).

Among plants, dicotyledons (in the traditional sense) are paraphyletic because the group excludes monocotyledons. "Dicotyledon" has not been used as a botanic classification for decades, but is allowed as a synonym of Magnoliopsida. Phylogenetic analysis indicates that the monocots are a development from a dicot ancestor. Excluding monocots from the dicots makes the latter a paraphyletic group.

Among animals, several familiar groups are not, in fact, clades. The order Artiodactyla (even-toed ungulates) as traditionally defined is paraphyletic because it excludes Cetaceans (whales, dolphins, etc.). Under the ranks of the ICZN Code, the two taxa are separate orders. Molecular studies, however, have shown that the Cetacea descend from artiodactyl ancestors, although the precise phylogeny within the order remains uncertain. Without the Cetaceans  the Artiodactyls are paraphyletic.
The class Reptilia, as traditionally defined, is paraphyletic because it excludes birds (class Aves) and mammals. Under the ranks of the ICZN Code, these three taxa are separate classes. However, mammals hail from the synapsids (which were once described as "mammal-like reptiles") and birds are sister taxon to a group of dinosaurs (part of Diapsida), both of which are "reptiles". Alternatively, reptiles are paraphyletic because they gave rise to (only) birds. Birds and reptiles together make Sauropsids, a clade of Amniota that is the sister group of the clade that includes mammals.

Osteichthyes, bony fish, are paraphyletic when circumscribed to include only Actinopterygii (ray-finned fish) and Sarcopterygii (lungfish, etc.), and to exclude tetrapods; more recently, Osteichthyes is treated as a clade, including the tetrapods.

The "wasps" are paraphyletic, consisting of the narrow-waisted Apocrita without the ants and bees. The sawflies (Symphyta) are similarly paraphyletic, forming all of the Hymenoptera except for the Apocrita, a clade deep within the sawfly tree.
Crustaceans are not a clade because the Hexapoda (insects) are excluded. The modern clade that spans all of them is the Tetraconata.

One of the goals of modern taxonomy over the past fifty years has been to eliminate paraphyletic "groups", such as the examples given here, from formal classifications.

Paraphyly in species 

Species have a special status in systematics as being an observable feature of nature itself and as the basic unit of classification. Some articulations of the phylogenetic species concept require species to be monophyletic, but paraphyletic species are common in nature, to the extent that they do not have a single common ancestor. Indeed, for sexually reproducing taxa, no species has a "single common ancestor" organism.  Paraphyly is common in speciation, whereby a mother species (a paraspecies) gives rise to a daughter species without itself becoming extinct. Research indicates as many as 20 percent of all animal species and between 20 and 50 percent of plant species are paraphyletic. Accounting for these facts, some taxonomists argue that paraphyly is a trait of nature that should be acknowledged at higher taxonomic levels.

Cladists advocate a phylogenetic species concept  that does not consider species to exhibit the properties of monophyly or paraphyly, concepts under that perspective which apply only to groups of species. They consider Zander's extension of the "paraphyletic species" argument to higher taxa to represent a category error

Uses for paraphyletic groups 

When the appearance of significant traits has led a subclade on an evolutionary path very divergent from that of a more inclusive clade, it often makes sense to study the paraphyletic group that remains without considering the larger clade. For example, the Neogene evolution of the Artiodactyla (even-toed ungulates, like deer, cows, pigs and hippopotamuses - note that Cervidae, Bovidae, Suidae and Hippopotamidae, the families that contain these various artiodactyls, are all monophyletic groups) has taken place in environments so different from that of the Cetacea (whales, dolphins, and porpoises) that the Artiodactyla are often studied in isolation even though the cetaceans are a descendant group. The prokaryote group is another example; it is paraphyletic because it is composed of two Domains (Eubacteria and Archaea) and excludes (the eukaryotes). It is very useful because it has a clearly defined and significant distinction (absence of a cell nucleus, a plesiomorphy) from its excluded descendants.

Also, some systematists recognize paraphyletic groups as being involved in evolutionary transitions, the development of the first tetrapods from their ancestors for example. Any name given to these hypothetical ancestors to distinguish them from tetrapods—"fish", for example—necessarily picks out a paraphyletic group, because the descendant tetrapods are not included.  Other systematists consider reification of paraphyletic groups to obscure inferred patterns of evolutionary history.

The term "evolutionary grade" is sometimes used for paraphyletic groups.
Moreover, the concepts of monophyly, paraphyly, and polyphyly have been used in deducing key genes for barcoding of diverse group of species.

Independently evolved traits 

Current phylogenetic hypotheses of tetrapod relationships imply that viviparity, the production of offspring without the external laying of a fertilized egg, developed independently in the lineages that led to humans (Homo sapiens) and southern water skinks (Eulampus tympanum, a kind of lizard). Put another way, viviparity is a synapomorphy for Theria within mammals, and an autapomorphy for Eulamprus tympanum (or perhaps a synapomorphy, if other Eulamprus species are also viviparous).

"Groups" based on independently-developed traits such as these examples of viviparity represent examples of polyphyly, not paraphyly.

Not paraphyly 

 Amphibious fish are polyphyletic, not paraphyletic. Although they appear similar, several different groups of amphibious fishes such as mudskippers and lungfishes evolved independently in a process of convergent evolution in distant relatives faced with similar ecological circumstances.
 Flightless birds are polyphyletic because they independently (in parallel) lost the ability to fly.
 Animals with a dorsal fin are not paraphyletic, even though their last common ancestor may have had such a fin, because the Mesozoic ancestors of porpoises did not have such a fin, whereas pre-Mesozoic fish did have one.
 Quadrupedal archosaurs are not a paraphyletic group. Bipedal dinosaurs like Eoraptor, ancestral to quadrupedal ones, were descendants of the last common ancestor of quadrupedal dinosaurs and other quadrupedal archosaurs like the crocodilians.

Non-exhaustive list of paraphyletic groups 
The following list recapitulates a number of paraphyletic groups proposed in the literature, and provides the corresponding monophyletic taxa.

Linguistics 

The concept of paraphyly has also been applied to historical linguistics, where the methods of cladistics have found some utility in comparing languages. For instance, the Formosan languages form a paraphyletic group of the Austronesian languages because they consist of the nine branches of the Austronesian family that are not Malayo-Polynesian and are restricted to the island of Taiwan.

See also 
 Glossary of scientific naming

Notes

References

Bibliography 

 
 Paraphyletic groups as natural units of biological classification

External links 

 
 

Phylogenetics
Paraphyletic groups